The 2017–18 Oregon Ducks women's basketball team represented the University of Oregon during the 2017–18 NCAA Division I women's basketball season. The Ducks, led by fourth-year head coach Kelly Graves, play their games at the Matthew Knight Arena as members of the Pac-12 Conference. They finished the season 33–5, 16–2 in Pac-12 play to win the Pac-12 regular season title. They also won the Pac-12 women's tournament for the first time in school history and earns an automatic bid to the NCAA women's tournament where they defeated Seattle and Minnesota in the first and second rounds, Central Michigan in the sweet sixteen before falling to Notre Dame in the elite eight. With 33 wins, they finished with the most wins in school history.

Offseason

Departures

In addition to the departing players, assistant Nicole Powell left after the 2016–17 season to become the head coach at Grand Canyon, located in her hometown of Phoenix.

Incoming transfer

Roster

Schedule

|-
!colspan=9 style="background:#004F27; color:yellow;"| Exhibition

|-
!colspan=9 style="background:#004F27; color:yellow;"| Non-conference regular season

|-
!colspan=9 style="background:#004F27; color:yellow;"| Pac-12 regular season

|-
!colspan=9 style="background:#004F27;"| Pac-12 Women's Tournament

|-
!colspan=9 style="background:#004F27;"| NCAA Women's Tournament

Rankings
2017–18 NCAA Division I women's basketball rankings

See also
 2017–18 Oregon Ducks men's basketball team

References

Oregon Ducks women's basketball seasons
Oregon
Oregon Ducks
Oregon Ducks
Oregon